The P.Z.L. 27 was a prototype airliner/mail plane designed by Zbysław Ciołkosz and constructed at P.Z.L. in 1933.

Design and development
Ordered by the Polish Ministry of Transport as a fast mail-plane, the prototype flew for the first time in September 1933 and was the first P.Z.L. aircraft with a retractable landing gear. Several tests made at the Institute of Aviation in 1935-1936 showed that the plane had poor performance and was uneconomical to operate.

Technical design
Construction of the P.Z.L. 27 consisted of a welded steel tube fuselage and tail-unit covered with fabric and a wooden 2-spar wing. Three  de Havilland Gipsy Major I engines were fitted, one in the nose and two in strut-mounted nacelles under the high-set wings. The retractable landing gear retracted manually into the rear of the engine nacelles, with a non-retractable tail-skid at the extreme rear of the fuselage.

Operational history
After initial flight testing the prototype P.Z.L. 27 the aircraft was returned to P.Z.L. to have a revised wing fitted to alleviate problems with insufficient stiffness and poor lateral stability. After a second phase of testing a Certificate of Airworthiness was issued and the aircraft was equipped for use as an airliner, being delivered to P.L.L. (LOT). LOT used the aircraft for proving flights on mail routes but regarded it as obsolete, refusing to order production aircraft. The RWD 11, designed in competition with the P.Z.L. 27, was regarded as superior but this aircraft also failed to attract production orders.

After accumulating 70 hours flying with LOT, the P.Z.L. 27 was bought by the Polish Air Force for the I.T.L. (Instytut Techniczny Lotnictwa - Technical Aviation Institute). It was used for transport, but crashed in an accident near Piaseczno in 1937, when piloted by Andrzej Włodarkiewicz.

Operators

LOT Polish Airlines operated the sole prototype.
Polish Air Force

Specifications (P.Z.L. 27)

See also

References 

27
1930s Polish aircraft
Trimotors
High-wing aircraft